Richard Andre Carey (born May 6, 1968 in Seattle, Washington) is a former American football defensive back in the NFL for the Cincinnati Bengals and Buffalo Bills.  He played college football at the University of Idaho.

References 

1968 births
Living people
Players of American football from Seattle
American football defensive backs
Idaho Vandals football players
Cincinnati Bengals players
Buffalo Bills players
Cincinnati Rockers players
Tampa Bay Storm players
New York/New Jersey Knights players